Through the Mist is a Canadian drama film, directed by Jean-Philippe Duval and released in 2009. A biopic of rock musician Dédé Fortin of Les Colocs, the film stars Sébastien Ricard as Fortin.

The film's cast also included Joseph Mesiano as Mike Sawatzky, Yan Rompré as Serge Robert, Dimitri Storoge as Patrick Esposito Di Napoli and Bénédicte Décary as Nicole Bélanger, as well as Claudia Ferri, Mélissa Désormeaux-Poulin and Louis Saia. However, Bélanger criticized the film as inaccurate.

Awards
The film received ten Prix Jutra nominations in 2010, including Best Film. It won the awards for Best Actor (Ricard), Best Art Direction (David Pelletier), Best Costume Design (Judy Jonker) and Best Music.

References

External links

2009 films
Canadian biographical drama films
Quebec films
Biographical films about singers
Canadian rock music films
Cultural depictions of Canadian men
Cultural depictions of rock musicians
2009 biographical drama films
2009 drama films
Films directed by Jean-Philippe Duval
French-language Canadian films
2000s Canadian films